This is the character list of 2019 Ultra Series Ultraman Taiga. Starting with September 29, 2019, the show coincided its airing with YouTube-exclusive miniseries Ultra Galaxy Fight: New Generation Heroes.

E.G.I.S.

Hiroyuki Kudo
 is the 22-year-old protagonist who has a kind personality and strong sense of justice, dreaming of becoming a bridge between humankind, aliens and Ultramen.

As a child, Hiroyuki tried to save Chibisuke from the Lecuumm alien but was rescued by Taiga's wandering particles of light to survive his fall. During his adulthood and membership in E.G.I.S., Hiroyuki was given the means to become Taiga during combat and eventually two other members of Tri-Squad that made their way to Earth. After his attempt in freeing Taiga from Tregear's corruption, he was accepted as the honorary member of the Tri-Squad. In the final episodes, Hiroyuki's double life as a Tri-Squad member was revealed to have been known by Kana and Homare, both of them chastise him for his poor attempt in keeping secret.

In Ultraman Taiga The Movie, Hiroyuki becomes the target of the Villain Guild, which lead to the members of New Generation Heroes appearing one after another to protect him. Hiroyuki became reckless in the fight, which resulted in Taiga's concern for the youth.

Homare Soya
 is a 25-year-old member with a sense of justice and is faithful to any given mission. He is Hiroyuki's senior and is often enraged when the former ran away in important missions. As he often took on dangerous tasks, Homare puts his high physicality to use while usually partnering with Hiroyuki.

In his past, Homare was actually an  banished from his homeworld and made his reputation as a renowned fighter in an alien gang. He provided refuge to an outcast Volk and joined the Villain Guild at a very young age but quit it after finding a new resolve in his life, which lead to his membership in E.G.I.S.. Despite his human-like appearance, Homare displays several of his alien physicality, including the ability to jump from high places and break free from metal chains.

Pirika Asahikawa
 is a 23-year-old operator who is capable of handling cyber security-related cases. Although usually did her job from the office, she can also participate in outside missions, having did so to replace Hiroyuki due to his arm injury.

Her true identity is an android named , one of the many androids created by scientists of  that went scattered to eliminate Woola at the cost of their own well-being. She was discovered by Kana 7 years prior to the series and was given a place in E.G.I.S.. After her boss Kana was rescued from Gorothunder, Kirisaki attempts to harass her in order to spite Hiroyuki but switched plans by summoning Woola after probing through Pirika's mind. Fully aware of her mission, Pirika used the Villain Guild's  to digitize herself, only to discover the planet eater was only troubled by its own existence. Because of this, she instructed E.G.I.S. in an operation to satiate its hunger. Although seemingly killed in Woola's explosion, Taiga managed to salvage at least her memories and inspector Sakura contacted former residents of Planet Eomapp to provide a spare body for her, allowing Pirika to be restored and reunited with E.G.I.S..

In Ultraman Taiga The Movie, Pirika was infected by a virus during her undercover in the alien hideout. She was saved by Daichi Ozora, who lost his ability to unite with X.

Kana Sasaki
After her failure to protect a Cicada Girl from being delivered to a research lab from a murder case, Kana left her job to establish E.G.I.S. She puts up a rather playful facade but shows a serious attitude when handling an alien case and is observant of her workers. Additionally as a result from her past trauma, Kana becomes dedicated to help both human and aliens alike, going as far as to give the former Villain Guild aliens Homare, Magma and Merkind and the android Pirika a membership in E.G.I.S.. Alongside Homare, Kana was already aware of Hiroyuki's double life as the Tri-Squad but keeps it to herself until the final battle with Woola.

In Ultraman Taiga The Movie, Kana lead the E.G.I.S. members in an undercover operation within the Villain Guild's hideout. There, she found herself under allying with Gai Kurenai.

Alien Magma
 is a former member of Villain Guild who kidnapped the Baby Zandrias as a leverage to call its mother in a fight against their Zegun, forced to fall back when Zegun was killed by Hellberus. After Zolin's arrest and Woola's arrival, Magma and Merkind attempted to leave Earth but changed their mind after being inspired by Pirika's bravery, offering their assistance to E.G.I.S. in an operation to neutralize Woola. Magma rode his  alongside Homare to launch a white hole missile, therefore allowing Taiga to free the monster from its own existence. As a result of their cooperation, both aliens were given membership in E.G.I.S. by Kana.

In Ultraman Taiga The Movie, Alien Magma was injured from E.G.I.S.'s fight with Dada's team of Villain Guild. He was absent during the New Generation Heroes' fight with Tregear, but assisted Homare off-camera to provide a map of the possessed-Taro's locations.

Alien Merkind
 is a former auctioneer of Villain Guild, responsible for selling the group's captured monsters to the highest bidders. Although not appeared, Merkind was responsible for purchasing the Monster Bomb Darebolic alongside the Alien Zetton "Zolin". At some point after Zolin's capture and Pirika's digitization into Woola's body, Merkind and Alien Magma offer their assistance, wherein the former took over Pirika's position as the analyzer of E.G.I.S.' attempt to satiate Woola. His involvement earned him a membership in E.G.I.S. by Kana at the end of the series, currently working as the team's accountant.

Merkind was present during the cold opening of Ultraman Taiga The Movie, but was absent during the New Generation Heroes' fight with Tregear.

Ultra Warriors

Tri-Squad
The  is a trio of Ultramen with different origins who join forces to preserve peace in space. Initially thought to have killed by Tregear, their scattered lights wandered in outer space as they reunite on Earth bonding with the same host, Hiroyuki.

The item functions by scanning , each with different results:
: Represents the Tri-Squad's transformations.
: Powers of past Ultra Warriors, specifically the New Generation Heroes. It functions by empowering the Tri-Squad's finishing techniques.
Its mainly used by Taiga to tap into the monster's own power, but was carefully planned by Tregear as a way of influencing him through slow corruption.

Ultraman Taiga
Although the founder and leader of Tri-Squad, he yearns for his father's respect and grows to become a proper hero despite his youthful age, 4,800 years old.

In his younger days, Taiga found solace in the blue Ultra named Filis and trains harder after being overshadowed by his father's popularity. During his journey in outer space, he join forces with Andro Ares in Planet Maiji to fight against Imbeeza's platoon of Gua Army. He would soon meet Titas and Fuma within their respective homeworlds, which resulted in the formation of Tri-Squad. Following his defeat by Tregear, Taiga's particles of light wandered in space-time continuum and bonded with Hiroyuki to save the boy from a great fall. As his body recuperated in the span of 12 years, Taiga reveal himself to save the Zandrias family from Hellberus while dedicating his life to save Earth from multiple threats. Taiga grew stronger with his own set of powers, but slowly fell into the corruption induced from prolonged use of the Monster Rings. He was rescued by Hiroyuki and eventually gains a new form, Tri-Strium, as a result. After the battle against Woola, Taiga offered Tregear a chance of redemption, but was rejected and forced to defeat him with Quattro Squad Blaster.

At some point later on, Taiga found himself facing against his corrupted father and dealt with a reckless Hiroyuki. Riku give the Ultra an advice of facing one's father, and that only their son that could save them.

Taiga's fighting skill is balanced and utilizes the same stance as his father. Taiga would later gain access to other forms in the series progress:
: Taiga's power-up form, which he obtained through Ai Tennoji's help. His personal Key Holder was upgraded into  as Hiroyuki scans it thrice and empowers the Ultra with the energy of the Earth and Sun.
Taiga obtains the sword named , allowing him to utilize enhanced versions of the Tri-Squad members' finishing moves or his independent attack, .

Ultraman Titas
 is the 9,000-year-old  from Planet U40, the birthplace of Ultraman Joneus. Unlike the rest of his kind, Titas is actually the son to a pair of Heller's Soldiers as he was jettisoned to the Planet U40 by his father, who wanted his son to follow a different path. During the Ultra People's final stand against the Heller Empire, Titas was hesitant in initiating Ultra Change until the death of Matia triggered his first transformation and killed the monster Kishiadar. Titas met Taiga when the latter visited U40 and later on forms the Tri-Squad after Fuma joined them.

Following his defeat from Tregear, Titas' particles of light roamed in outer space and assisted the spirit of Nana Kujō to stop her vengeful husband from destroying Cozmo Technica. After fulfilling her wish and stopping Galactron MK2, Titas bonded with Hiroyuki as he reunited with Taiga.

With his carefully trained body and healthy spirit, Titas is skilled in heavyweight battles. Being an Ultra Person of U40, Titas bears a  that he obtained by the Great Sage but operates normally like a Land of Light Ultra's Color Timer. His black coloration is said to be a remnant from his Anti-Ultra Humanoid origin. In the Voice Drama, Titas originally transformed with his race's Beam Flasher before he acquired his copy of Taiga Spark.

Ultraman Fuma
 is the 5,000-year-old  from Planet O-50, the origin of Ultraman Orb, Ultraman Rosso and Ultraman Blu. Prior to the series, Fuma was originally a human-like son of a climber who gave up halfway to the Warrior's Peak of Planet O-50. He was born on said planet as his father was incapable of returning to his home world out of embarrassment. While making his living as a street child, the boy received tutelage under an alien named Gerg and the two since then took various odd jobs in hopes of being recognized by O-50's Ring of Light. After being injured by the Interstellar Alliance due to being tricked into fighting his mentor, Fuma was brought to the Warrior's Peak and becomes an Ultraman in order to save his life. He had since remain as an Ultraman to honor Gerg. Fuma would meet Taiga and Titas when his home world was under attack by alien forces and together, the three defend the Warrior's Peak and form the Tri-Squad.

After his seeming death from Tregear, Fuma's particles entered a jewelry which passed on to various users, with the recent owner being the Villain Guild itself. Volk stole it in hopes of selling it to support the impoverished alien children before Fuma escaped to fight Darebolic and rejoin the Tri-Squad.

He has a rough personality, but also a strong sense of duty. Fuma utilizes speed and agility during combat, as well as firing energy shuriken.

Ultraman Ribut
 is an Ultraman from the Land of Light that previously debuted from the 2014 season of Malaysian animation Upin & Ipin, later on making his live debut in Ultra Galaxy Fight: New Generation Heroes. Aged 5,700 years old, he is a member of the peacekeeping organization  and dedicated to protect the life forms in outer space. After rescuing a Ragon in Planet Liquitor, Ribut fulfills Taro's request to rescue Rosso and Blu from Planet Penol but failed to apprehend an escaping Tregear before the evil Ultra sent his Red Kings as distractions.

Ultraman Reiga
 is an Ultra that debuted in Ultraman Taiga The Movie. He is a result of all New Generation Heroes combining with Hiroyuki into a new warrior.

As it contains all 11 New Generation Heroes, Reiga has the ability to fight on par with Grimdo.

Ultraman Reiga is voiced by Takuma Terashima, who is also Taiga's voice actor.

Audio drama-exclusive characters
: A blue tribe member of the Land of Light Ultras, Filis works in the Space Science Technology Bureau as an archivist of past relics, including a particular weapon belonging to Mebius. He also served as a counselor to the young Taiga, who was furious from living under his father's shadow. He is voiced by Takehisa Hirose.
: The son of U40 Fleet Commander  and Titas' childhood friend. After a young Titas was adopted by Zamius for a reason, Matia and Titas grew up together as if they were brothers. In the final days of the Heller Empire, the two became separated from their team and joined Grigoreos' camp as they fought against the monster Kishiadar. Matia's death from the ensuing battle gave Titas the final push to initiate his first Ultra Change.
: A U40 inhabitant and the captain of a division joined by young Titas and Matia, reprimanding the former for his refusal to transform. When Joneus, the Science Guard's Ultria and the U Fleet planned an attack from their planet's atmosphere, Grigoreos commanded his team to attack Kishiadar the next morning and died in the ensuing battle.
: An Andro Super Warrior that Taiga met during the Gua Army's attack on a remote planet known as  when being a cadet of the Space Garrisons. In battle, he utilizes a pair of the  handguns as his weapons, which has , a pair of daggers. He is also able to perform the  attack.
: A captain of a U40 space ship. While sending back the Science Guard to Earth after the war against the Heller Empire, he became friendly with Daisuke Gondō, the captain of the Science Guard who gave his favorite sunglasses as proof of the friendship to him.
He is voiced by Kanato Watarai and based on Go Toki from Dinosaur Corps Koseidon.
: The captain of the Koseidon Corps' air unit.

Other Ultra Warriors
: A peacekeeping organization in the Land of Light.
: A division of 11 Ultras, the six major members (Zoffy to Taro) force a teleportation to the Minato brothers (as Rosso and Blu no less) in the light of League of Darkness' assaults.
: See here.
: The leader of Ultra Brothers and friends of Father Of Ultra and Mother Of Ultra.
: See here.
: See here.
: Adoptive brother of Ultraman Taro.
: For more information, see here.
: See here.
: See here.
: A team of post-2013 Ultra Warriors starting from Ultraman Ginga. The group was assembled by Taro in the wake of League of Darkness' campaign before pursuing Tregear. As they were incapacitated from the vile Ultra's minefield, Ginga lead his team members in donating their bracelets to the Tri-Squad in hopes that their juniors would carry on the battle. As revealed in Ultraman Taiga The Movie, the New Generation Heroes sacrificed their transformation abilities to seal Grimdo into a barrier. In order to regain them, the human hosts went to Earth and protect Hiroyuki from the Villain Guild assailants and reclaim their bracelets.
: The fusion of Ginga and Victory, formed by their respective component's resolve to fight under Zero's memory and was utilized to eliminate Etelgar and Dark Lugiel in the League of Darkness' Dark Palace.
/: An Ultraman who came from future, Ginga rescued X and Geed from Dark Lugiel on Planet Sundowin before bringing them to the Land of Light. Hikaru/Ginga becomes the leader of the assembled New Generation Heroes to save Zero and Grigio from Planet Tenebris. Once provided with the power boost by other members, Ginga Strium performs  to defeat Ultra Dark-Killer and destroying his Dark Palace. In Ultraman Taiga The Movie, Hikaru and Sho rescued Homare from Kirisaki's assault. In the English dub of Galaxy Fight, he is voiced by Peter von Gomm.
/: Ginga's partner from Victorian, Victory was sent to rescue Orb from O-50 when the League of Darkness try to steal his light energy.
: When Dark-Killer terrorizes the outer space, X join forces with Geed to detain him, but his light energy was stolen for the creation of X Darkness, leaving him weakened on  before Ginga bails him from Dark Lugiel.
: Ultraman X's human host and a Xio officer. As a result of his X Devizer turned white, Daichi lost the ability to unite with X and saved an infected Pirika from the malwares. In the English dub of Galaxy Fight, Mark Stein voices him when conversing through X.
: During his return to Planet O-50, Orb was ambushed by X and Geed Darkness, who proceed to steal his light energy before Victory interrupts the process and bail them out to the Land of Light. During the events of Ultraman Taiga The Movie, Gai visited the Villain Guild hideout and rescued the E.G.I.S. leader Kana.
: Under demands from AIB, Geed was sent to arrest Dark-Killer for terrorizing the outer space where he join forces with Ultraman X. Unfortunately his light energy was stolen to create Ultraman Geed Darkness, leaving him weakened before Ginga bails them out from Dark Lugiel. Geed's final battle with his father was referenced by Alien Godola and Zero in episode 23 when Mabuze brings the possibility to resurrect Belial as a clone. As he approach Hiroyuki, Riku advised Taiga of a son's fight with their father and assured of his role to save Taro.
: The combination of the Minato siblings' Ultramen counterparts, utilized to stop the rampaging Dark-Killer. The formation of Ultraman Gruebe was deemed as a threat by Tregear, which resulted with Dark-Killer kidnapping Ultrawoman Grigio in Ultra Galaxy Fight, therefore setting the motion of the miniseries.
: The only female member of the group, Grigio becomes the sole protector of Ayaka City after her brothers studying abroad. While honing her skills on the countryside, Grigio and Zero fell victim to Dark-Killer's assault, setting up the motion of the miniseries. After Dark-Killer's defeat, Grigio was sent back to Earth in order to protect Ayaka City, thus being absent from the New Generation Heroes' pursuit of Tregear during the cold opening of Ultraman Taiga.
: The fusion of the older brother pair Rosso and Blu, formed after Grigio recharge their Color Timers. This fusion was utilized to fight the combined efforts of Zero Darkness and Dark Killer, killing the former with Ruebe Vortex Buster.
/: Taking place after the end of R/B the Movie, Rosso was teleported from Milan by Taro. His and Blu's attempt to find Grigio lands them in a fight with Etelgar on Planet Penol until Ribut bails them out. In Ultraman Taiga The Movie, Katsumi posed as a client of E.G.I.S. to lure them towards the Ginga Quattro Market, doing so to save Hiroyuki from being a target.
/: Likewise with Rosso, Blu was teleported from California to the Land of Light by Taro, joining forces with Rosso to save their sister Grigio. In Ultraman Taiga The Movie, Isami joined his brother in protecting Hiroyuki from the Villain Guild, wielding self-crafted weapons in likeness of their R/B Sluggers.
: The Ultra Warrior from his starring series, he becomes an inspiration for Titas to study Earth's culture and greeted Taiga during his first arrival on U40.
Unnamed Ultraman (10): An unnamed Ultraman was an opponent who defeated the Alien Nackle Odyssa in an unnamed alien planet. His silhouette bore an identical appearance to Ultraman Jack (hence his scene was based on episode 37 of Return of Ultraman), but their connection remains unknown.

Antagonists

Ultraman Tregear

Villain Guild
The  is an alien criminal group that operate in a space saucer. Their modus operandi involves unleashing monster weapons into the city to sell them towards the highest bidder. Despite Zolin's arrest, the group is still at large, with another branch operated in the United States. In Ultraman Taiga The Movie, several of the group members attempt to target Hiroyuki to take the Taiga Spark from him and make a lot of money off of it while finding themselves opposed by past members of New Generation Heroes.

Members
: One of the aliens who try to intercept E.G.I.S.' escort operation before being killed by Ckalutch's misfired attempt. First appeared in episode 16 of Ultra Q.
: First appeared in Ultraman Orb The Movie.
1: Alongside Cicadaman, he tried to intercept E.G.I.S.' delivery of Baby Zandrias and was killed by Cicadaman's misfired attempt.
Movie: One of the aliens that are in the Villain Guild hideout, he was defeated alongside other members by Kana and Gai.
: First appeared in episode 26 of Ultra Q: Dark Fantasy.
2: An alien who kidnapped Chibisuke in the past while encountering the young Hiroyuki Kudo. In the present day, he and two other members of Villain Guild were responsible for manipulating King Guesra with a controller. When their operations were discovered by E.G.I.S., Lecuum managed to avoid Hiroyuki. He is voiced by Katsumi Fukuhara.
Movie: One of the aliens that try to target Hiroyuki in the Ginga Quattro Market, he was defeated alongside Hypnas and Pedan by Isami.
: First appeared in episode 8 of Ultraseven X.
9: One of the two aliens who try to steal Maiko's talisman before being killed by Majappa.
Movie: One of the aliens that try to target Hiroyuki in the Ginga Quattro Market, he was defeated alongside Lecuum and Pedan by Isami.
: First mentioned in episode 12 of Ultra Q but physically appeared in episode 6 of Ultra Galaxy Mega Monster Battle: Never Ending Odyssey.
9: One of the two aliens who try to steal Maiko's talisman before being defeated by Homare.
Movie: One of the aliens that try to target Hiroyuki in the Ginga Quattro Market. Alongside Shaplay and Serpent, he fought Katsumi before being forced to fall back when Grimdo revived.
: First appeared in episode 15 of Ultra Seven.
4: An alien who got involved, along with Volk, in an alien gang conflict.
17: One of the aliens who try to take back their monster induction device from Meed, who stole it from them.
Movie: One of the aliens that try to target Hiroyuki in the Ginga Quattro Market, he was defeated alongside Lecuum and Hypnas by Isami.
: First appeared in episode 19 of Ultra Seven.
: An alien hitman who is hired by Zolin.
Movie: One of the aliens that are in the Villain Guild hideout, he was defeated alongside other members by Kana and Gai.
: A Dadaism-themed alien who leads a small group of thieves. He and other group members stole the blue stone of Baradhi. After Homare recovered the stolen stone, Dada unleashed and piloted Legionoid Dada Customize before being killed in the destruction of the robot.
: One of the aliens that are in the Villain Guild hideout, he was defeated alongside other members by Kana and Gai. First appeared in episode 31 of Return of Ultraman.
: One of the aliens that try to target Hiroyuki in the Ginga Quattro Market. Alongside Keel and Serpent, he fought Katsumi before being forced to fall back when Grimdo revived. First appeared in episode 20 of Ultra Seven.
: One of the aliens that try to target Hiroyuki in the Ginga Quattro Market. Alongside Keel and Shaplay, he fought Katsumi before being forced to fall back when Grimdo revived. First appeared in episode 39 of Ultraman Mebius.
: A Villain Guild sniper who is one of the aliens that try to target Hiroyuki in the Ginga Quattro Market. He tried to shoot at Hiroyuki but was knocked out by Riku. He is a tribute to Grozam from episodes 43-46 of Ultraman Mebius.

Monsters
: A living weapon that the Villain Guild stole for auction, arranging it to fight the Young Mother Zandrias to attract bidders until it was killed by Kirisaki's Hellberus. First appeared in episode 14 of Ultraman Geed.
: A juvenile monster from the  species, first appearing in episode 6 of Ultraman. It was named by Hiroyuki, who fed it with chocolates until a Lecuum abducted it.
: Within the span of 12 years, Chibisuke was modified into a gigantic monster weapon by the Villain Guild, now named King Guesra. With a microchip implanted on its brain, it was guided by Lecuum's controller to attack cacao bean storage area to demonstrate its might for the Villain Guild's auction. Regardless of Kirisaki's attempt to provoke it, Hiroyuki and Taiga managed to bring Chibisuke to its senses until Tregear appeared fought both of them. Chibisuke was killed in an attempt to shield Taiga from Tregear's Trera Cheir Phos. First appeared in Superior Ultraman 8 Brothers.
: A gigantic monster weapon that Zolin bought at an auction. Volk and two other aliens try to use it to force the Japanese government into paying the ransom money in hopes of supporting the impoverished children until Zolin's assassin opened fire as Darebolic appeared from the Monster Bomb's detonation. Having incapacitated Taiga, Darebolic was no match for Fuma's speed and destroyed by Seven Stars Light Wave Shuriken. First appeared in Ultraman Orb the Movie
First appeared in episode 5 of Ultraman Ace.
: Dada's giant robot, it was destroyed by Taiga's Taiga Dynamite Shoot, killing the alien as a result. First appeared in episode 18 of Ultraman Geed.

League of Darkness
The  are the main antagonists of the prequel miniseries, Ultra Galaxy Fight: New Generations Heroes, an evil army consist of Ultra Dark-Killer, the revived of Dark Lugiel and Etelgar, and the Darkness Ultramen clones.

Members
: A demon born from the grudges of past monsters fought by members of the Ultra Brothers. He was killed by Taro's Super Ultra Dynamite with the help of the Ultra Brothers. As he was revived, Dark-Killer resurrected Etelgar and Lugiel to his cause and threatened the safety of X, Geed, Zero and Grigio, forcing Taro to recruit the New Generation Heroes in his fight. Initially killed by Ultraman Ruebe, Tregear revived him into 200 meter tall rampant that New Generation Heroes fight with their strongest forms/fusion. In a desperate bid to gain the advantage of the fight, he recreated and consume his Darkness Warriors as Ginga Strium delivers the finishing blow New Generation Dynamite, sealing his fate to be killed permanently. Dark-Killer is capable of creating a copy of an Ultra Warrior and the pocket dimension  to drain the energies of his captives. First appeared in the pachinko game, Ultraman Taro: Fight! Ulra 6 Brothers.
:  By stealing the light energy of an Ultra Warrior, Dark-Killer fuses it with his  to create their respective  copies as part of the League of Darkness' combatants. The first to be created were X and Geed Darkness, who defeated their original templates in  before absorbing Orb's light on Planet O-50 to create his counterpart on Tenebris. Once the New Generation Heroes storm the planet, the three copies proceed to fight their template while the last clone, Zero Darkness fend off against Ultraman Zero and Grigio. With the exception of Zero Darkness, all initial three copies were killed by their respective templates, wielding the power of Ultraman Zero. Dark-Killer recreates the quartet to consume them as an additional boost to empower himself before being killed by Ginga Strium. Koichi Sakamoto envisions the clones after the Ultra Dark-Killer Brothers from Ultraman Taro: Revenge of the Dark pachinko game.
: A dark clone of Ultraman X's basic form, created with his stolen light energy fused to Dark-Killer's Killer Plasma. He was killed by Ultraman X Ultraman Zero Armor's Final Ultimate Zero.
: A dark clone of Ultraman Geed Primitive, created by fusing his stolen light with Dark-Killer's Killer Plasma. He was killed by Geed Magnificent's Big Bustaway.
: A clone of Ultraman Orb Orb Origin, created by Dark-Killer through X Darkness and Geed Darkness stealing Orb's light. Although his process was incomplete due to Victory's interruption from the theft of Orb's light, Orb Darkness is still capable of fighting on equal terms with the original. He was killed by Orb Emerium Slugger's ES Spacium and Hyper Ultra Knock Tactic. He wields the antithesis of Orbcalibur, through which he could perform .
: A clone of Ultraman Zero that Dark-Killer creates through his stolen light in the Dark-Killer Zone. His name and appearance is based on Zero's trauma of being possessed by Belial. Initially fighting against the intensely drained Zero and Grigio, Zero Darkness join his creator in fighting Ruebe before he was killed by Ruebe Vortex Buster. Tregear revived Zero Darkness for Zero Beyond to fight and killed by his Twin Giga Break. His main ability involves firing purple bullets and a red Wide Zero Shot.
: Ultraman Ginga's darker counterpart and the major antagonist of Ultraman Ginga. Alongside Etelgar, Dark Lugiel was revived to join the League of Darkness and failed to intercept X and Geed from escaping Planet Sundowin. He agreed to cooperate with the League under the terms of finishing Ginga with his own hands and was killed by Ultraman Gingavictory's Wide Zero Shot.
: Revived alongside Dark Lugiel as part of League of Darkness, Etelgar was dispatched to intercept Rosso and Blu in  before Ribut enters the fray to bail the brothers out. Likewise, Etelgar agreed to assist the League under the terms of finishing Victory by himself and was killed alongside Lugiel by Ultraman Gingavictory's Wide Zero Shot. His voice is reprised by  since Ultraman Ginga S The Movie and provided by Lyle Carr in the English dub. Alongside Dark Lugiel, Etelgar was chosen due to their connection with Ultraman Ginga.

Grimdo
 is the final villain of Ultraman Taiga The Movie. Long ago, Grimdo existed as a primordial deity since the era of chaos and was sealed within  to maintain the balance of the universe. During Tregear's self-exile from the Land of Light, he freed Grimdo from its prison and form a pact by absorbing the monster into his body, with a set of restraints keeping its presence at bay. With Grimdo's nigh-omnipotent powers, Tregear strength surpassed even a Super Ultraman and is capable of using bodies of his alternate selves as backups to cheat death.

After his defeat by Ultraman Taiga Tri-Strium's Quattro Squad Blaster, the seal broke and a fragment of Grimdo was temporarily sealed through the New Generation Heroes after sacrificing their transformation powers. Six months later in Ultraman Taiga The Movie, Grimdo was unleashed from its seal and possessed Ultraman Taro during his attempt on using Ultra Dynamite, placing him under Tregear's control. When the Tri-Squad expelled Grimdo from Taro, Tregear allowed the ancient god to consumed him to restore its full power as it fought against and was defeated by Ultraman Reiga's Reiga Ultimate Blaster.

After it was unleashed from Tregear's restraints, Grimdo was only half of its original strength, as the other half remained in the fallen Ultra. To restore its full power, Tregear offered himself as a sacrifice in his desperate bid to kill Taro and the New Generation Heroes, as it grew large and has the ability to terraform Earth into a similar environment to Planet Volhes.

Other characters
: A police officer in External Affairs Division X, who occasionally requested E.G.I.S.'s help in solving alien-related cases.
: The late wife of Rento, she was among the casualties of their space station's destruction. Her wish to stop Rento was heard by Titas as he brought her spirit on Earth to reunite with Rento. After thanking the Ultraman, the couple passes on to afterlife.
When Rento try to kill him in revenge, Imazato hired E.G.I.S. for protection. Following Galactron MK2's destruction, he was punched by Homare for his troubles while his massive payment was refused by Kana.
: A denpa net idol who possesses the powers of a shaman, the former incarnation of her who sealed away Night Fang. Her inherited ability from her ancestor plays an important part in providing Taiga access to his new form, Photon-Earth.
: Ai's manager, who was impersonated by an Alien Babarue to lure Ai to Kuzuryu Village.
: Kana's childhood friend who realized her childhood dream to open her own cake shop. She was attacked by Gymaira on her way back from E.G.I.S.' office.
: A boy who has a friendship with Moko.
: The researcher of the faculty of engineering at Touto University who developed a device named CQ that can distinguish aliens from humans. She is targeted by the Villain Guild, who wants to prevent the development of CQ.
: A 19-year-old man who joins E.G.I.S. as a probationary member. He hates aliens because his mother got injured due to Zetton controlled by Alien Bat.
: Osamu's currently-hospitalized mother.

Monsters and aliens

Tregear-related
First appeared in episodes 8 and 25 of Ultraman respectively.
: A space monster who gains reputation on outer space for its might, it was summoned by Tregear as the first opponent that Taiga faced in the present day, who destroy it with Supreme Blaster. It is armed with blade protrusions on its body, extendable tail and firing . Hellberus was revived from its Monster Ring by Kirisaki to aid Night Fang in defending a brainwashed Taiga, until it was reverted to its ring by Taiga Tri-Strium's Titas Burning Hammer. In Ultraman Taiga The Movie, after Tregear's confiscation of the Hellberus Ring, Hellberus was revived from its ring by him before being destroyed by Gingavictory's Ultra Fusion Shoot.
: Originally a married astronaut named  who was killed when his space satellite exploded upon collision with Cozmo Technica's rocket. He was revived by Tregear and return to Earth to kill the company's president Imazato. After hacking all satellites to fall on Earth, Rento uses an alien gun to transform into Galactron MK2 and almost killed Taiga until Titas quelled his anger by reuniting him with his late wife Nana as they passed on to afterlife. Its ring was confiscated by Tregear after successfully brainwashing Taiga. Tregear revives Galactron MK2 as a bait for the recently arrived Woola and was consumed in the middle of its fight with Taiga.
: A former Villain Guild member who was once given refuge by Homare while being on the run from a rival gang. Alongside a Serpent and Galmess, Volk was provoked by Tregear/Kirisaki to steal Zolin's Darebolic (MB) to get the ransom money from the government in hopes of helping the impoverished alien children. He was incapacitated by Zolin's agent and the crystal he stole reunited Fuma with the Tri-Squad. In his dying breath, Volk expressed his admiration in Homare and hoped the latter would continue helping the children before passing away.
: The younger brother of Sadis from Ultraman Orb The Movie who became a hitman cyborg that worked in-between dimensions and was hired by Tregear to kill the Tri-Squad. Encountering a lone Perolynga that wanted to go home, Abel was about to shoot him and Kana for being his witnesses but faced against the Tri-Squad and defeated by Fuma's Trenchant-Star Light Wave Shuriken. Because of his admiration to Sadis, Abel willingly receive his cybernetic to follow his brother's footstep and appeared seemingly identical, save for his blue color and red eyes.
: The Seger race's monster, whose body is a natural producer of poison and can exhale the venomous fire  from its mouth. Segmeger rampaged on various planets under its master to expand the Seger's influence before it arrived on Earth by Aoi's command. After its defeat by Taiga, Segmeger was revived by Aoi after her cover was blown but her death turned the tides of the battle. Its ring was confiscated by Tregear after successfully brainwashing Taiga. In Ultraman Taiga The Movie, Segmeger was revived from its ring by Tregear before being destroyed by Orb Trinity's Trinitium Light Ring.
: A space monster that was sealed away in a rocky mountain in the abandoned  by a shaman long ago. In the present day, it was released by an Alien Babarue by forcing Ai to undo the seal and the monster escaped after a short scuffle with Taiga. In the city, it unleashes  to induce the citizens in their nightmares and absorb their fears. Pirika was able to neutralize the wave as Taiga fought the monster and uses Aurum Strium to finish it. At some point later on, Night Fang was revived to assist Hellberus in defending a brainwashed Taiga from the Tri-Squad until it was reverted to Night Fang Ring by Taiga Tri-Strium. In Ultraman Taiga The Movie, after Tregear's confiscation of the Night Fang Ring, Night Fang was revived from its ring by him before being destroyed by Geed Ultimate Final's Crescent Final Geed.
He lives a peaceful life on Earth after being defeated by an Ultra Warrior on a planet about 50 years ago. His Alien Nackle suit was modeled after the original Nackle from episode 37 of Return of Ultraman.
: Odyssa's monster. First appeared in episode 37 of Return of Ultraman.
: A monster that uses its tentacle-like split tongue to consume the energy that fills the universe. First appeared in episode 17 of Ultraman 80.
: A robot that is brought on Earth by Tregear. A long time ago, all Gigadelos were created by Ilt to protect several aliens and their respective planets against monster attacks, but fought each other and ruined many planets because Tregear input his consciousness into them. One model made its way to Earth under Tregear's orders in order to further descend Taiga into darkness by using the Night Fang Ring to counter its cloning ability, . Its ring was confiscated by Tregear after successfully brainwashing Taiga. In Ultraman Taiga The Movie, the Gigadelos was revived from its ring by Tregear before being destroyed by Exceed X Beta Spark Armor's Beta Spark Arrow.
: An alien scientist and the creator of Gigadelos who travels the universe to retrieve his out-of-control robots. On Earth, he kidnaps Hiroyuki and stole the Tri-Squad's Key Holders out of fear for someone to bear enormous power. After a brief fight with Kirisaki, Ilt realized too late of the latter's true intention and shuts down the Gigadelos, allowing Taiga to destroy it. In aftermath, Ilt departs to outer space to shut down several more of Gigadelos.
: An alien swindler and thief who was caught by Kana four times when she was a police officer in External Affairs Division X. He is targeted by the Villain Guild because he said some of their secrets before being released from prison. After stealing the criminal group's monster induction device from Alien Pedan, he tries to resell it for money.
: A monster that emerges on the ground due to the Villain Guild's monster induction device activated by Tregear. It fought against and was killed by Taiga Tri Strium's Taiga Blast Attack. First appeared in episode 1 of Ultraman X.
: A monster that Tregear gave Alien Bat. First appeared in episode 39 of Ultraman.
: A warlike space monster that is based on the Raijin, who gained his reputation for being the fiercest being on outer space. He was summoned to Earth by Tregear and turn him into the  before he was deployed to kidnap Kana in his bellybutton. After his defeat, Taiga salvages the Gorothunder Ring. In Ultraman Taiga The Movie, after Tregear's confiscation of the Gorothunder Ring, Gorothunder was revived from its ring by him before being destroyed by Gruebe's Gruebing Ray. He can unleash the  tornado energy from his gauntlet and generate electricity to shoot  by drumming the tomoe symbols on his chest.
: An ally of Alien Bat, Alien Ghose came to Earth, bringing along his pet monster Pandon. As means of communication, his race needs to borrow the body of a human or alien to speak human language. Despite being assaulted by the xenophobic Tasaki and Pandon running amok out of grief for its master, Alien Ghose managed to end both conflict peacefully. However, his spacecraft's drilling missile was utilized by Kirisaki to launch a homing beacon that attracted a meteorite from outer space to Earth. His species first appearing in episode 48 of Ultra Seven.
: Alien Ghose's monster, Pandon surfaced and fought Taiga after its master was assaulted by Tasaki. Although Ghose managed to put out the fight, Pandon was killed by Tregear. First appeared in episode 48 of Ultra Seven.
: The final monster in the series, a pseudo-life form with a black hole within its stomach, an all-consuming monster that came into being born from numerous trash deposits from various alien civilizations. Attracted by energy sources, Woola destroys worlds by eating its way to a planet's core. When Tregear learned of Woola's existence from probing Pirika's mind, he uses Alien Ghose's drill missile to unleash a plast of Earth's energy to outer space as a beacon signal for Woola. Once arriving on Earth, it feeds upon the recently revived Galactron MK2 and emerged victorious in its fight against Taiga Tri-Strium. When Pirika attempted to shut down Woola's life force, she discovered that the monster was simply in agony of its own cursed existence and continuous absorption of negative energies. This leads to a cooperation between E.G.I.S. and former Villain Guild members Magma and Merkind to neutralize said black hole with a white hole. Once the deed was done, Taiga used Zero's power to push Tregear's own energy for the monster to feed on before exploding, causing the previously consumed energies to return to their sources.

Others
First appeared in episode 21 of Ultra Q.
: A monster in Planet Liquitor, whose capable of cryokinesis. While threatening a lone Ragon, Peguila was defeated by Ultraman Ribut as his first kill in the miniseries. First appeared in episode 5 of Ultra Q.
He hired the help from E.G.I.S. to escort him and the Baby Zandrias safely until Alien Magma stole it from him after he terminate his deal with the team. With Taiga rescuing the Baby Zandrias from Hellberus, Kawazu provided explanation of the Ultra to E.G.I.S. members before he parted ways.
: A monster species that went endangered due to being easy targets of predators at a young age. First appeared in episode 4 of Ultraman 80.
: An infant Kawazu try to protect before Magma kidnaps it as leverage to lure Young Mother Zandrias.
: The mother of Baby Zandrias, whose status is due to her motherhood at an early age. While her child was taken by Magma, Young Mother Zandrias was subjected to Zegun's assaults for the Villain Guild to find their highest bidder. When Hellberus appears, the maternal monster defend its child and Hiroyuki before Taiga rescued the family. With the whole ordeal ended, the family departs to outer space.
: An information broker in the disguise of a hippie, Homare paid the information for Darebolic with his favorite yogurt.
Possessing Alien Alien Serpent (4, 19): A race of aliens. First appeared in episode 39 of Ultraman Mebius.
4: An ally of Volk.
19: An alien who was heavily questioned by Hiroyuki about Kirisaki.
: First appeared in Ultraman Orb The Movie.
4: An ally of Volk.
25: An alien who lives on Earth.
Slaughter Alien Hypnas (4): One of the three alien gang members who fought with Homare. First appeared in episode 8 of Ultraseven X.
: An alien whose homeworld was destroyed by Segmeger. Having survived the assault, he went to E.G.I.S. and relay the information while requesting their help to stop Alien Seger.
While roaming in a shopping mall, Aoi encountered Pirika and became fast friends but was forced to reveal her true colors after that. Taking Pirika's words to heart, Aoi sacrificed herself by turning into an antidote to heal Titas.
: An alien whose parents were murdered by an unidentified murderer 10 years ago. Kana's regret of not being able to save her lead to the foundation of E.G.I.S..
: A race of aliens that went to Earth once in 50 years. One unnamed member try to fetch his little brother home but was forced to return alone after the latter becomes captivated by Earth. First appeared in episode 45 of Ultra Seven.
: A homesick Perolynga who was left behind on Earth for about 50 years after his human companion refused to join him in his space travel. In the present day, he encountered Abel in order to return to his home planet but was saved by Kana. As he continued from being chased by Abel and witnessed the Tri-Squad's battle, Kana's words changed his mind about returning home and eventually decided to stay on Earth for another period.
: An alien who disguised himself as Ai's manager, Higo, to use her powers to unseal Night Fang. He was killed by Fuma's Trenchant-Star Light Wave Shuriken while distracting the Ultra long enough for Night Fang to return. Likewise with the original Higo, he is voiced by Masato Kawamorita. His species first appearing in episode 38 of Ultraman Leo.
: A race of aliens. First appeared in episode 47 of Ultra Seven.
7: An ally of Alien Babarue.
18: An ally of Alien Bat.
: A monster that was sealed away in a small bottle by Maiko's ancestor on a planet. Its sealed form was passed over to Maiko's ancestors for generations until she became its current inheritor, leading to a feud with the Villain Guild until its accidental release. It was killed by Taiga Photon-Earth's Aurum Strium. According to director Masayoshi Takesue, Majappa is the original variant of Maga-Jappa from Ultraman Orb.
: Homare's childhood friend who is a descendant of the alien clan that is responsible for sealing away Majappa.
: An alien who uses her magic wand to cast magic spells.
: An alien who targets Maria's magical power to control Gymaira. After narrowly escaping Pagos' rampage, he was knocked out by Tregear, who proceed to heal Gymaira in a cave.
: A monster that arises from its sleep due to Gymaira rampaging underground and emerges on the ground. After its demise by Fuma, Pagos petrify itself and bits of its corpse were salvaged by the cleaning workers on the day after that. First appeared in episode 18 of Ultra Q, Pagos' suit was a newly made version in the same way as Neronga from Ultraman R/B.
: An alien mad scientist who experimented with various creatures to create the ultimate life form. He bought Ultraman Belial's B Factor at the Villain Guild's auction and use it to create Skull Gomora. At some point later on, Mabuze approached a trio of aliens who wanted to eliminate Taiga and Tregear by offering his service to create Imit-Ultraman Belial. Mabuze and the three aliens were killed after the Belial clone accidentally crashed their building when the latter intended to attack Tregear.
Mabuze's captives (15): As part of his experiments, Mabuze captures small creatures for his own experiments and place them within cages. When Skull Gomora begins to attack, Hiroyuki freed the creatures before the laboratory's own destruction.
: A juvenile Samekujira that first appeared in episode 9 of Ultraman X.
: The diminutive form of an adult Eleking. First appeared in Ultraman Mebius as a Maquette Monster copy of the original monster.
: A juvenile Vadata, first appeared in episode 50 of Ultraman Cosmos.
: First appeared in episode 38 of Ultraman Tiga.
: First appeared in Heisei Ultraseven.
: First appeared in episode 9 of Neo Ultra Q.
: A recreation of the original Belial Fusion Monster from episode 1 of Ultraman Geed. It was created by Alien Chibull "Mabuze" from the DNA factors of Gomora, Red King and Ultraman Belial that he purchased from the Villain Guild and proceed to rampage in the nearby town. Under the corruption of the Monster Rings, Taiga delivers a merciless kill to Skull Gomora and destroying it with Aurum Strium.
: A space lifeform known as  that has a friendship with Kanta. First appeared in episode 5 of Ultraman Geed.
: Mabuze's android troops. First appeared in episode 1 of Ultraman Ginga S.
Insect Alien Alien Ckalutch (17): An alien who comes to Earth to buy the Villain Guild's monster induction device from Meed. After the deal goes wrong, he tries to kill Meed but ends up being defeated by Kana and arrested by External Affairs Division X. He is voiced by Takatora Shimada, his species first appearing in Ultraman Orb The Movie.
: First appeared in episode 3 of Ultra Seven.
25: An alien who lives on Earth.
: A monster that is controlled by Alien Huk. It was killed by Titas' Astro Beam after fighting the Tri-Squad members. First appeared in episode 1 of Ultraman.
: External Affairs Division X's undercover agent in the Villain Guild who is an  who was Sachiko Motomiya's friend named  when the two were children. After the completion of the task, he leaves Japan to investigate the Villain Guild in USA.
: An octopoda monster with sticky suction cups and feeds on petroleum oil. As the incarnation of the sea, Takkong previously sealed Giestron but turned weak due to its old age. Having previously defeated the Tri-Squad, Takkong join forces with Taiga Tri-Strium to defeat Giestron. In aftermath of the battle, Takkong leaves with Shinji to return to the ocean. First appeared in episode 1 of Return of Ultraman, Takkong's entire scene is a tribute to its debut in the aforementioned series.
: A monster that represents the Earth's anger, due to land pollution caused by humans. Giestron was previously sealed by Takkong in the ancient times, but resurfaces to continue its deed. Giestron was defeated by the combined efforts of Taiga Tri-Strium and Takkong. It is a variant of Arstron from episode 1 of Return of Ultraman, and first appeared in the Ultraman Festival 2019.
: A mysterious boy who appears in front of Hiroyuki and predicts the emergence of Giestron. His true form is a boy with octopus tentacles for hands, he sought the Tri-Squad's assistance to support Takkong in defeating Giestron. In aftermath of the fight, Shinji bids farewell to Hiroyuki and leaves with Takkong for the ocean. He is based on Shinichi, the Nonmalt messenger from episode 42 of Ultra Seven.
: An ally of Mabuze.
: An ally of Mabuze.
: An ally of Mabuze.
: A clone of the late Ultraman Belial that was created by Mabuze after offering his service to a trio of aliens. The result was a mindless clone with yellowish claws and crest, whose sole purpose of existence was to destroy everything in its path. Imit-Belial fought against the Tri-Squad and Tregear per his creator's orders, but finds himself joining forces with the fallen Ultra when Ultraman Zero assisted Taiga in the fight. He was killed by Taiga Tri-Strium's Taiga Dynamite Shoot when Tregear used him as a meat shield. His finishing move is a replication of Belial's Deathcium Ray.

Audio drama-exclusive
: The Heller Army's monster. It killed the division members, including Matia and Grigoreos, before being destroyed by Titas.
: An alien who wants to go to the Warrior's Peak to obtain the power of light. His race are four-armed amphibians who lived in an entirely aquatic planet that was destroyed from a civil war. As he taught the young Fuma of self defense and running an odd job together, Gerg returned to the Warrior's Peak as a monster that terrorized the climbers, forcing the Interstellar Alliance to trick Fuma into fighting each other and striking both of them at once. In order to save Fuma, Gerg climbs to the peak and wished the Ring of Light to save Fuma, to which it complied by turning his student into an Ultraman. What happened to Gerg afterwards was unknown, but Fuma remains in his Ultraman form as a token of respect to his teacher.
: An evil empire lead by the emperor Gua from the Andro Melos multimedia series.
When losing his right arm in his fight with Andro Ares, Imbeeza ran away before Pestoria killed him for his failure to invade Planet Maiji. He is voiced by Takatora Shimada.
: Imbeeza's modified monster and a member of the Gua Army, based on Birdon from episode 18 of Ultraman Taro. It was easily destroyed along with Re-Brocken by Andro Ares.
: Imbeeza's modified Terrible-Monster and a member of the Gua Army, based on Brocken from episode 6 of Ultraman Ace. It was easily destroyed along with Mecha Birdon by Andro Ares.
: Imbeeza's Fighting Bem and a member of the Gua Army. He was easily destroyed by Andro Ares. First appeared in episode 25 of Andro Melos.
: Imbeeza's Fighting Bem and a member of the Gua Army. He was easily destroyed by Andro Ares. First appeared in episode 2 of Andro Melos.
: Imbeeza's Fighting Bem and a member of the Gua Army. He was easily destroyed by Andro Ares. First appeared in episode 9 of Andro Melos.
: Imbeeza's modified monster and a member of the Gua Army, armed with autocannons across its entire body and based on Zaragas from episode 36 of Ultraman. It was easily destroyed along with Alien Iros and Beakon by Andro Ares.
: Imbeeza's modified alien and a member of the Gua Army, implanted with a missile launcher and based on Alien Iros from episode 13 of Ultra Seven. He was easily destroyed along with Zaragas and Beakon by Andro Ares.
: Imbeeza's modified monster and a member of the Gua Army, used as a laser turret and based on Beakon from episode 21 of Return of Ultraman. It was easily destroyed along with Zaragas and Alien Iros by Andro Ares.
: Imbeeza's modified monster and a member of the Gua Army, based on Muruchi from episode 33 of Return of Ultraman. It stopped when Taiga punched a hole through its body.
: A gigantic mecha modeled after  from episode 13 of Ultraman. It has the  built in its mouth.
He was possessed by Paraidar on Planet Sorkin while traveling through the universe. He is voiced by Kōichi Toshima.
: The younger sister of Ausar XIII who requested Titas to kill her brother, who became a different person after returning from traveling. She later piloted Dairaoh to defeat Paraidar.
: An energy organism and spirit parasite-type  who possessed Ausar XIII on Planet Sorkin. He ascended the throne after killing the king and expanded armaments production for the invasion of other planets. When the possession of Ausar XIII by Paraidar was exposed by Titas, the monster left the young king before fighting the Ultraman. He possessed a huge pyramid and turned it into the form of a giant to crush Titas, but became impossible to leave the stone body due to a molecular anchoring beam from Nix's space ship. After his right arm was destroyed by Titas, ironically, he was finished off by Dairaoh.
: A giant humanoid robot customized for Ausar XIII that was created by order of Paraidar as the young king.
: A sickly alien little girl. Her race is a plant alien, resembling human with green skin and a flower bud on her head. She was brought by Fuma to visit the outer space but discovers that her race emits hazardous aroma should they visited extraterrestrial planets. She is voiced by Ayaka Nanase.
: Iriya's father, he has a blue flower on his head. He is voiced by Takatora Shimada.
: A dinosaur trainer who modifies and trains dinosaurs inhabiting planets to use them for invasion purposes. On , after Death Rex's destruction, Darugen rode on Duran's back and fought the Tri-Squad before dying as a result of the pterosaur's destruction. His species first appeared in Dinosaur War Izenborg.
: Darugen's modified dinosaur and the first enemy that the Tri-Squad fought. It was destroyed by Titas.
: Darugen's modified pterosaur. It was destroyed by Taiga.
Hornworm-like monster (SP2): A species of space monsters that consume plants to mature into their imago form.
: The ' space station-type gigantic space battleship which carries disk-shaped fighters. The 20 invading battleships deployed around Planet Chrono were destroyed by the Tri-Squad and the Koseidon Corps. First appeared in Dinosaur Corps Koseidon.

Novel-exclusives
During young Taro and Tregear's exploration to said planet, the two encountered the monsters and were targets of assimilation. Taro managed to destroy both of them using Strium Beam and Ultra Dynamite before Tregear could be assimilated.
: A creature created by Tregear in  using a pool of primordial soup. It was made under the image of Namegon from Ultra Q and was meant to be Tregear's companion during his self-exile from the Land of Light, but when Snark grew bigger and began consuming nearby cities, Tregear was forced to kill it by devolving his creation into a withering flower.
: The main antagonist of Ultraman Orb The Movie, Murnau was the first person Tregear encountered after his fusion with Grimdo. Originally a frail and old thief in her final years in Planet Cobol, Tregear provided her with eternal youth and crystallization powers, setting forth the motion of her movie appearance.
: A space white blood cell tasked in cleansing the universe from its potential dangers. Tregear rewrote its genetic information to consume planets unconditionally and setting forth the events of Ultraman R/B.
: A void monster that Tregear encountered in a passing, it is also the final villain of Ultraman X.
: Riku/Geed's alien companion from Ultraman Geed. Tregear orchestrated the events of Ultraman R/B The Movie by kidnapping Pega shoved him into Gan-Q as a hostage situation, hoping to get Riku fall into the darkness in the same way as Belial.

Notes

References

Sources

External links
Official website for the cast list of Ultraman Taiga

, Ultraman Taiga
Taiga